Robert Richard "Rob" Dyson (born June 21, 1946) is a retired American sports car racing driver and owner of Dyson Racing.

Dyson began competing in amateur SCCA competition in 1974 and began racing professionally in IMSA GTO and the Trans-Am Series in 1982. In 1985 be purchased a Porsche 962 from Bruce Leven and began racing in IMSA GTP. In 1995 his team was the first to run the new Riley & Scott Mk III, refusing to run the Ferrari 333 SP, as he felt it would make the World Sportscar Championship a "spec series" if all major teams were running the car. Rob and his team with its R&S Mk III won the 1997 24 Hours of Daytona with an "all star" squad of seven drivers including sports car legends James Weaver, Elliott Forbes-Robinson, and Butch Leitzinger. The Dyson team again won the race in 1999, this time without Rob Dyson as one of the drivers. The team later purchased Lola chassis and began racing in the American Le Mans Series, where it currently competes. Dyson retired from full-time racing in 2003 but continued to drive part-time until 2007. Rob's son Chris Dyson drove for the team from 2001 to 2013.

Racing record

SCCA National Championship Runoffs

24 Hours of Le Mans results

References

External links
Dyson Racing
Rob Dyson at Driver Database

1946 births
24 Hours of Le Mans drivers
24 Hours of Daytona drivers
American Le Mans Series drivers
Rolex Sports Car Series drivers
Trans-Am Series drivers
Living people
SCCA National Championship Runoffs winners
Racing drivers from New York (state)